Khamseng Sivilai (born ? – died ?) was a lowland Lao politician and member of the Lao People's Revolutionary Party (LPRP). He attended the founding congress of what would later become the Lao People's Revolutionary Party (LPRP) and was elected as one of five members of the 1st Central Executive Committee.

He also served as the party's first leader of organizational work from 25 March 1955 to February 1957.

References

Specific

Bibliography
Books:
 

Members of the 1st Central Committee of the Lao People's Party
Lao People's Revolutionary Party politicians
Place of birth missing